La Drenne is a commune in the department of Oise, northern France. The municipality was established on 1 January 2017 by merger of the former communes of Le Déluge (the seat), La Neuville-d'Aumont and Ressons-l'Abbaye.

See also 
Communes of the Oise department

References 

Communes of Oise
Communes nouvelles of Oise
Populated places established in 2017
2017 establishments in France